Zoopy was an online and mobile social media community, hosting user generated videos, photos and audio.

History
Zoopy launched into closed beta in late 2006 and moved into live beta with public access on 5 March 2007.

In December 2007, Nokia selected Zoopy as its regional imaging partner for South and West Africa.

On June 26, 2008, Vodacom purchased a 40% share stake in Zoopy and increased its stake to 75% in February 2009, and acquired the remainder of the company in August 2010.

On 1 February 2011, Zoopy repositioned itself as a mobile video entertainment platform, delivering videos of the latest news, sport and entertainment in 90 seconds or less.

In July 2012, Zoopy Founder and CEO Jason Elk as well as co-founder and operations director Pat Elk left the company following the news that Vodacom was planning to sell a significant stake in Zoopy.

The platform was shut down in late 2012.

References

Defunct social networking services
Former video hosting services
Internet properties established in 2006
Internet properties disestablished in 2012